Matías Leichner (born July 2, 1987 in Córdoba, Argentina) is an Argentine footballer currently playing for Atenas de Río Cuarto of the Primera División C in Chile.

Teams
  Talleres de Perico 2008
  General Paz Juniors 2009-2011
  Teniente Origone 2011-2012
  Naval 2012
  Atenas de Río Cuarto 2013–present

References

External links
 
 

1987 births
Living people
Argentine footballers
Argentine expatriate footballers
Naval de Talcahuano footballers
Primera B de Chile players
Expatriate footballers in Chile
Talleres de Perico footballers
Association football forwards
Footballers from Córdoba, Argentina